Immolate Yourself is the third studio album by Telefon Tel Aviv, an American electronic music duo consisting of Joshua Eustis and Charles Cooper. It was released on BPitch Control in 2009. It peaked at number 17 on the Billboard Top Dance/Electronic Albums chart. Two days after its release, Cooper died of an accidental overdose of sleeping pills and alcohol.

Background
In a 2016 interview with Huck, Joshua Eustis recalled that they were listening to Orchestral Manoeuvres in the Dark (OMD) a lot during the making of the album. He added: "We were listening to a lot of minimal wave and stuff like that. A lot of krautrock and psychedelic stuff – all of these things that we loved but we still wanted to have some element of futurism and romanticism and that's kind of what came out."

Critical reception

At Metacritic, which assigns a weighted average score out of 100 to reviews from mainstream critics, the album received an average score of 75, based on 15 reviews, indicating "generally favorable reviews".

Jesse Cataldo of Slant Magazine stated that "it's the rare electronic work that feels entirely alive, exhibiting shocking versatility and a strong feel for creating vibrant, engaging environments." David Abravanel of Cokemachineglow called the album "the most consistent release from the duo."

Track listing

Personnel
Credits adapted from liner notes.

Telefon Tel Aviv
 Joshua Eustis – performance, production, design, photography
 Charles Cooper – performance, production

Additional personnel
 Turk Dietrich – performance (5), production (5)
 Ryan Rapsys – drums (10)
 Rolan Vega – some sounds (10)
 Roger Seibel – mastering
 Wolfel – design
 James Hughes – typography

Charts

References

External links
 

2009 albums
Telefon Tel Aviv albums
BPitch Control albums